Jemison High School is a secondary school located in Jemison, Alabama, which educates grades 9-12.  The school mascot is the Panther. The marching band is the Jemison Blue Regiment Band. There are two concert band groups; the advanced group is the Jemison High School Wind Ensemble and the second group is the Jemison High School Concert Band. JHS has a football team, baseball team, basketball team, archery club, golf team, volleyball and more. JHS boasts an active VEX Robotics team (TSA) as well as an extensive Culinary Arts department.

External links
 Jemison High School official website

References

Public high schools in Alabama
Schools in Chilton County, Alabama